Angela Mortimer defeated Christine Truman in the final, 4–6, 6–4, 7–5 to win the ladies' singles tennis title at the 1961 Wimbledon Championships. It was the last all-British final to date. Maria Bueno was the reigning champion, but did not defend her title due to jaundice.

Seeds

  Sandra Reynolds (semifinals)
  Margaret Smith (quarterfinals)
  Ann Haydon (fourth round)
  Lesley Turner (second round)
  Yola Ramírez (quarterfinals)
  Christine Truman (final)
  Angela Mortimer (champion)
  Karen Hantze (quarterfinals)

As originally seeded,  Darlene Hard was the fifth seed, but when she withdrew from the championships before the draw was made, the seeding list was redrafted and she was replaced by Yola Ramírez.

Draw

Finals

Top half

Section 1

Section 2

Section 3

Section 4

Bottom half

Section 5

Section 6

Section 7

Section 8

References

External links

Women's Singles
Wimbledon Championship by year – Women's singles
Wimbledon Championships
Wimbledon Championships